The 2013 Judo Grand Prix Ulaanbaatar was held in Ulaanbaatar, Mongolia from 13 to 14 July 2013.

Medal summary

Men's events

Women's events

Source Results

Medal table

References

External links
 

2013 IJF World Tour
2013 Judo Grand Prix
IJF World Tour Ulaanbaatar
Judo
Grand Prix 2013
Judo
Judo
Judo